Asilus sericeus is a species of robber fly in the family Asilidae. The larvae measure 18 – 20 mm long. It lives underground. Adults catch prey in flight. They haven't been reported feeding on bees or wasps, like other members of the family.

References

Asilinae
Articles created by Qbugbot
Insects described in 1823